Michał Szromnik (born 4 March 1993) is a Polish professional footballer who plays as a goalkeeper for Śląsk Wrocław in the Ekstraklasa. He has previously played for Arka Gdynia, Bytovia Bytów, Odra Opole and Scottish club Dundee United. He has represented the Poland under-21 team.

Playing career

Club
Born in Gdańsk, Szromnik began his career with local regional league club Gedania Gdańsk. He joined Arka Gdynia in 2009 and was promoted to their first team squad a year later. He joined Scottish Premiership side Dundee United in July 2014, signing a three-year contract. He made his first team debut for the club in February 2015, but was sent off in his second appearance. At the end of the 2015–16 season, Szromnik left United by mutual consent. He returned to Poland, signing for I liga club Bytovia Bytów in July 2016. He then joined Odra Opole in June 2018. In July 2019, he joined Chrobry Głogów on a one-year contract. On 4 July 2020, he signed a two-year contract with Śląsk Wrocław.

International
Szromnik has previously represented the Poland under-21 team.

References

External links
 
 

Living people
1993 births
Polish footballers
Polish expatriate footballers
Poland youth international footballers
Poland under-21 international footballers
Association football goalkeepers
Sportspeople from Gdańsk
Arka Gdynia players
Dundee United F.C. players
Bytovia Bytów players
Odra Opole players
Chrobry Głogów players
Śląsk Wrocław players
Scottish Professional Football League players
II liga players
I liga players
Ekstraklasa players
Expatriate footballers in Scotland
Polish expatriate sportspeople in Scotland